Clutter is the debut studio album by Laki Mera. In December 2007, prior to its official release on CD in April 2008, the band made the album available for free download via their record label, Rhythm of Life's website. The album was critically well-received, getting a 5 star review from The Herald, and the risky strategy of offering it for free proved beneficial to the band, providing them with exposure and increasing their audience.

Track listing

Personnel 
 Andrea Gobbi - Programming, synths, guitars
 Laura Donnelly - Vocals, Guitars, Synths
 Keir Long - Programming, Synths
 Trev Helliwell - Cello, Synths
 Tim Harbinson - Drums
 Laki Mera - Engineering

External links 
 Laki Mera on Myspace

References 

2008 debut albums
Laki Mera albums